Brittany Altomare (born November 19, 1990) is an American professional golfer currently playing on the LPGA Tour. She finished runner-up in the 2017 Evian Championship, losing to Anna Nordqvist in a playoff. She had finished tied for third in the Cambia Portland Classic two weeks earlier.

She won the Guardian Retirement Championship on the 2016 Symetra Tour, beating Nicole Broch Larsen at the fifth hole of a sudden-death playoff after the pair had finished level at 216 after 54 holes.

Professional wins (1)

Symetra Tour (1)
2016 Guardian Retirement Championship

Playoff record
LPGA Tour playoff record (0–1)

Team appearances
Amateur
Junior Ryder Cup (representing the United States): 2006

Professional
Solheim Cup (representing the United States): 2019, 2021

Solheim Cup record

References

External links

American female golfers
Virginia Cavaliers women's golfers
LPGA Tour golfers
Golfers from Massachusetts
Sportspeople from Worcester, Massachusetts
1990 births
Living people
20th-century American women
21st-century American women